Autonomous Space Transport Robotic Operations (ASTRO), is an American technology demonstration satellite which was operated as part of the Orbital Express program. It was used to demonstrate autonomous servicing and refuelling operations in orbit, performing tests on the NEXTSat satellite which was launched with ASTRO for that purpose. Launched in March 2007, it was operated for four months, and then deactivated in orbit.

ASTRO was launched by United Launch Alliance on an Atlas V 401 rocket; serial number AV-013. The launch occurred at 03:10 UTC on 9 March 2007, from Space Launch Complex 41 at the Cape Canaveral Air Force Station. The launch was contracted by the Space Test Program to launch the STPSat-1 spacecraft, and was named STP-1. It also deployed NEXTSat; as well as FalconSAT-3, CFESat and MidSTAR-1. The launch marked the first time United Launch Alliance had launched an Atlas V, the type having previously been operated by International Launch Services.

ASTRO was a  spacecraft, which was built by Boeing. It had a robotic arm, approx 4 metres when extended. It was able to transfer hydrazine to other satellites/NEXTSat.

It was operated in low Earth orbit.

After completing operations, the ASTRO and NEXTSat spacecraft were separated, and ASTRO performed a separation burn. On 21 July 2007, ASTRO was deactivated. It re-entered on October 25, 2013 (UTC).

References

Spacecraft launched in 2007
Spacecraft which reentered in 2013
Technology demonstration satellites
Satellites in low Earth orbit
Satellites of the United States